Selestino Ravutaumada (born 17 January 2000) is a Fijian rugby union player, currently playing for the . His preferred position is wing or fullback.

Professional career
Ravutaumada was named in the Fijian Drua squad for the 2022 Super Rugby Pacific season.

References

External links
itsrugby.co.uk Profile

2000 births
Living people
Fijian rugby union players
Rugby union wings
Rugby union fullbacks
Fijian Drua players